Mervyn Douglas Yelland (13 June 1906 – 19 August 1931) was an Australian rules footballer who played with Hawthorn in the Victorian Football League (VFL).

Notes

External links 

1906 births
1931 deaths
Australian rules footballers from Victoria (Australia)
Hawthorn Football Club players